Bolia is a small town in Inongo Territory of Mai-Ndombe Province of the Democratic Republic of the Congo, located east of Lake Tumba.  It is the headquarters for the Bolia Sector, which includes Bokwala, Lokanga, and Nkile. Its elevation is about 300 meters.

Notes and references

Populated places in Mai-Ndombe Province